The Hungarian Independence Party (MFP) was a political party in Hungary in the period after World War II.

History
The party was founded in 1947, shortly before the August elections that year. Led by Zoltán Pfeiffer, it won 49 of the 411 seats, becoming the fifth largest party in Parliament. However, in October the National Elections Committee ruled that the party had participated in the election unlawfully, and its seats were annulled.

A new party was established following the end of Communism. In the 1990 elections it received less than 0.1% of the vote, and did not run again.

References

Defunct political parties in Hungary
Political parties established in 1947